All World: The Greatest Hits is the first greatest hits compilation from hip hop artist LL Cool J, released on November 5, 1996, by Def Jam. It covers his career from the time of his Def Jam debut Radio, to his 1995 album Mr. Smith. All World has been certified platinum by the RIAA.

Track listing

"Jack The Ripper" on this collection is a different mix, with most of DJ Cut Creator's turntable techniques & breakdowns omitted-the original version can be found on the b-side of the "Going Back to Cali" single, or on the Def Jam 10th Anniversary box set.

Charts

Weekly charts

Year-end charts

Certifications

References

LL Cool J albums
Albums produced by Rick Rubin
Albums produced by Marley Marl
1996 greatest hits albums
Def Jam Recordings compilation albums